Pawn Ticket 210 is a 1922 American silent drama film directed by Scott R. Dunlap and starring Shirley Mason, Robert Agnew, and Irene Hunt.

Plot
As described in a film magazine, On the day that Mrs. Levi (Manners) leaves her husband Harris (Warren), another woman comes into his pawn shop and tries to purchase a handgun. While she is in there, a policeman brings in a baby girl whom he says the woman left in the street. Harris gives the woman, Ruth Sternhold (Hunt), a pawn ticket for the child and promises to care for her. Years later, when the child has become the young woman Meg (Mason), Harris discovers that she is falling in love with Chick Saxe (Agnew), one of the young fellows of the neighborhood who has a rather shady reputation. Harris wants to give Meg every opportunity, so he arranges for a friend, supposedly a wealthy bachelor, to let her live at his home. Meg goes to her new surroundings and one day by chance meets her old sweetheart Chick, who swears that he has reformed. Ruth appears at the pawn shop with her ticket and wants to reclaim her child. Harris takes her to the house Meg is staying at and discovers that not only is his friend the husband of Ruth, but he is also the man who robbed Harris of his wife. Meg is able to bring about a reconciliation between the man who raised her and her real father.

Cast
 Shirley Mason as Meg 
 Robert Agnew as Chick Saxe 
 Irene Hunt as Ruth Sternhold 
 Jacob Abrams as Abe Levi 
 Dorothy Manners as Mrs. Levi 
 Fred Warren as Harris Levi
 Muriel McCormac

Preservation
Pawn Ticket 210 is a lost film.

References

Bibliography
 Solomon, Aubrey. The Fox Film Corporation, 1915-1935: A History and Filmography. McFarland, 2011.

External links

1922 films
1922 drama films
Silent American drama films
Films directed by Scott R. Dunlap
American silent feature films
1920s English-language films
Fox Film films
American black-and-white films
1920s American films
English-language drama films